Anaconda 3: Offspring (also known as Anaconda III) is a 2008 American horror television film directed by Don E. FauntLeRoy and stars David Hasselhoff, Crystal Allen and John Rhys-Davies. The film is a sequel to Anacondas: The Hunt for the Blood Orchid (2004) and the third installment in the Anaconda film series.

It premiered on the Sci-Fi Channel on July 26, 2008, and was followed by Anacondas: Trail of Blood (2009).

Plot 
In Romania, an anaconda that was captured from the Amazon River is being held at a genetic research facility owned by Wexel Hall for experimentation where Professor Eric Kane has developed a serum for the Blood Orchid (the one recovered from the fountain after the ruins of the Borneo jungle). The research project is led by Dr. Amanda Hayes and funded by Peter "J.D." Murdoch, a well-known industrialist. While visiting the facility, Murdoch provokes the anaconda with a large flashlight, and has it gassed to calm it down. However, as Murdoch, his assistant Pinkus and Daryl are about to leave, the anaconda kills Daryl and breaks through the enclosure's wall. As it escapes, it kills many of the people working in the laboratory. In looking through the facility, Amanda and the professor realize that the anaconda also freed the queen anaconda. The anaconda soon sneaks up behind them and crushes the professor to death in its coils and bites his head off. Murdoch calls in a team of animal hunters, led by Stephen Hammett to capture both snakes. Amanda and Pinkus go with them. At a small farm in the middle of the woods, the owner is eaten alive by one of the snakes.

The hunting party arrives later and begin formulating a plan of attack. During the first confrontation with the snake, two of the party are killed: Grozny is stabbed by the genetically altered anaconda's very sharp tail and Dragosh gets his head bitten off by the snake. The attack destroys one of the team's vehicles. Hammett arrives and gives the team a lecture on how to kill the snake. As the group splits up, Amanda heads off in the remaining car with two other team members, Victor and Sofia. During the next confrontation with the snake, the anaconda spits acidic venom in Victor's face, burning it. The car crashes and Sofia is thrown from the car, breaking her leg in the process. As Amanda tries to leave the car to help her, the snake reappears and devours Sofia. Amanda is rescued by Hammett and both of them escape.

As they regroup, Amanda reluctantly reveals that the queen snake is pregnant and will give birth to more genetically "special" offspring in less than 24 hours. The team wants to call in the military, but Hammett forbids it and threatens Amanda with jail for her role in creating it. In the morning, the party begins searching for the snake, but they only find Sofia's corpse, which the snake had regurgulated. Pinkus is stabbed in the chest by the anaconda and is killed. While Hammett searches for the snake on foot, Amanda and one of the three remaining hunters, Nick, spot the snakes first going into an old factory and follow them in to plant explosives around the building. Before they can finish, the snake attacks. Nick helps Amanda escape, but is wounded by the snake as it impales him with its tail, but Nick is able to discharge a grenade, killing both himself and the snake. Hammett and his last remaining hunter, Andrei, arrive after hearing the grenade go off. As the two of them meet Amanda inside the factory, Andrei moves to set the charges, but Hammett kills him, causing Amanda to realize that Hammett is working for Murdoch, who wants a live baby anaconda. Inside the building, the queen gives birth. After wounding Hammett, Amanda sets the timer on the explosives and escapes from the building, leaving Hammett to be attacked by the baby snakes while he tries to reach the bomb. Once she is at a safe distance, the explosives detonate, killing Hammett, the queen, and the baby snakes. As she squats by a roadside burning all of her documentation on the snake research, one of Murdoch's men named Peter Resyner, whom Hammett had called earlier, drives by heading for the factory where he finds one baby snake still alive and delivers the snake to Murdoch.

Cast

Production 
The film was shot back-to-back with Anacondas: Trail of Blood in Romania (Bucharest, Danube Delta, etc.)

Reception 
Similar to many made-for-television sequels, the film received poor reviews for having little to nothing to do with the previous films, poor acting and lack of special effects.

See also
 List of killer snake films

References

External links 
 
 

2008 films
2008 horror films
2008 television films
2000s monster movies
American monster movies
American natural horror films
Romanian horror films
Romanian independent films
Action television films
American thriller television films
English-language Romanian films
Films about hunters
Films about snakes
Films set in forests
Films set in jungles
Films set in South America
Films shot in Romania
Films shot in Bucharest
Giant monster films
Syfy original films
American horror television films
Direct-to-video sequel films
Sony Pictures direct-to-video films
Stage 6 Films films
Television sequel films
Anaconda (film series)
Films directed by Don E. FauntLeRoy
2000s English-language films
2000s American films